Georg Christian Schemelli (born 1676 or 1678 or 1680 – 5 March 1762) was a German Protestant church musician. He is known for the publication Musicalisches Gesang-Buch, a collection of sacred songs to which Johann Sebastian Bach contributed.

Born in Herzberg, Schemelli was from 1695 to 1700 a student at the Thomasschule in Leipzig. From 1707, he held the position of church musician in Treuenbrietzen. From 1727 he was Hofkantor at the court of Zeitz, retiring in 1758. He died in Zeitz.

Musicalisches Gesang-Buch

In 1736, Schemelli published in Leipzig his Musicalisches Gesang-Buch (Musical song book), also known as Schemellis Gesangbuch, a collection of 954 sacred songs with texts in the tradition of pietism, and probably intended for private contemplation. Only 69 of the songs come with music, a melody and a bass line. The melodies are often like simple arias, rather than like chorales.

Bach contributed to the collection, but musicologists debate to what extent. Schemelli's son Christian Friedrich was a student of the Thomasschule from 1733 to 1735, and later studied at the  Leipzig University, which explains the contact. In the Bach-Werke-Verzeichnis (BWV), numbers 439 to 507 list songs from the Gesangbuch, but his authorship is certain only for three of them, "Dir, dir Jehovah, will ich singen", BWV 452, "Komm, süßer Tod", BWV 478, and "Vergiss mein nicht, vergiss mein nicht", BWV 505. Bach probably wrote the bass lines for the others, and modified some of the melodies.

Notes

References
   – facsimiles: szMJMq_zmygC at Google Books; 1077430 Liturg. 1372 o at Bavarian State Library; Musicalisches Gesang-Buch (Schemelli, Georg Christian) at IMSLP website.
  (subscription required)

Further reading

External links 
 
 Schemelli's Hymnal Bach-Bibliography
 Georg Christian Schemelli (1676?–1762) French National Library
 Raymond F. Glover: The Hymnal 1982 Companion, Volume 1 
 Geistliche Lieder und Arien BWV 439–507 Bach Cantatas Website
 Tobi’s Notenarchiv: Johann Sebastian Bach: Lieder, Arien und Quodlibet. Geistliche Lieder und Arien aus Schemellis Gesangbuch (capella-Format)

German Baroque composers
German classical organists
German male organists
People from Herzberg (Elster)
People educated at the St. Thomas School, Leipzig
17th-century births
1762 deaths
Male classical organists